Florence Chia-ying Yeh  (born July 1924), also known as Ye Jiaying, Jialing, and by her married name Chia-ying Yeh Chao, is a Chinese-born Canadian poet and sinologist.  She was a scholar of classical Chinese poetry. She taught for twenty years at the University of British Columbia (UBC), and has been Professor Emerita since her retirement in 1989. She is a Fellow of the Royal Society of Canada. After retiring from UBC, she has been teaching at Nankai University in Tianjin where she is the founding Director of the Institute of Chinese Classical Culture.

Early life and education

Chia-ying Yeh was born in Beijing in 1924. Her family was from the prominent Manchu clan of Yehe Nara, originally of Tümed Mongol ethnicity. The famous Qing dynasty poet Nalan Xingde was from the same clan. Her grandfather was a Qing official, and her sinicized family shortened its surname to the Han Chinese Yeh after the fall of the Manchu Qing dynasty in 1911.

Yeh began composing poetry at the age of ten. She was admitted to the Chinese department of Fu Jen Catholic University (Beijing) in 1941, where she studied under the well known scholar of poetry . After graduating in 1945, she taught in the then capital Nanjing, and married Chao Chung-sun (赵钟荪), a navy employee, in March 1948. By the end of the year, the Kuomintang government was losing the Chinese Civil War and busy retreating to Taiwan. Yeh also moved with her husband to Taiwan, and settled in Changhua, where Yeh found a teaching job at a secondary school. She gave birth to her first daughter Chao Yen-yen (赵言言) in August 1949.

During the White Terror period of Taiwan, numerous intellectuals were suspected of being Communist sympathizers and imprisoned without trial. In December 1949, Yeh's husband Chao Chung-sun was arrested on suspicion of being a Communist spy. In June 1950, Yeh was herself jailed, together with the principal and six other teachers at her school. She brought her daughter to the prison as the baby was less than a year old. She was released soon afterwards, but her husband was imprisoned for more than three years.

Career and later life
In the 1950s, Yeh taught classical Chinese poetry at National Taiwan University, Tamkang University, and Fu Jen University in Taiwan. She is often honoured as "the teacher of masters."

She moved to the United States in 1966, and taught at Michigan State University and Harvard University. She then settled in Vancouver, British Columbia, Canada, where she taught at the University of British Columbia from 1969 until retiring in 1989.

After Canada established diplomatic relations with the People's Republic of China, Yeh returned to China for the first time in 1974, and visited her brother who still lived in their old home. She composed a long poem to commemorate the visit.

Starting in 1979, Yeh returned to China every summer to teach at numerous universities, including Peking University, Beijing Normal University, Nankai University, Tianjin Normal University, Fudan University, Nanjing University, Nanjing Normal University, Xinjiang University, and Lanzhou University. She often paid for her own travel expenses and taught for free. She said that in mainland China there was a great desire to rediscover classical Chinese literature after the turmoil of the Cultural Revolution.

After Yeh retired from UBC in 1989, many Chinese universities invited her to teach in China full-time. She chose to teach at Nankai University in Tianjin, because her nephew was an alumnus and it was near her hometown Beijing. Nankai established the China Comparative Literature Institute (later renamed to Institute of Chinese Classical Culture) in 1993, headed by Yeh. She returns to UBC every summer to teach and research.

In May 2014, Nankai University held the Chinese Poetry International Seminar to commemorate Chia-ying Yeh's 90th birthday. For the occasion, former Chinese Premier Wen Jiabao wrote a work of calligraphy of one of Yeh's poems.

Scholarships
Yeh donated half of her pension fund from UBC to establish two scholarships at Nankai University. One is called the Yongyan (Yung-Yen) Scholarship, which combines the given names of her elder daughter Chao Yen-yen and son-in-law Chung Yung-t'ing, who died together in a car accident in 1976. The other is called Tuo'an, in memory of her teacher Gu Sui, whose hao was An-ming.

Works

Chia-ying Yeh has published many scholarly works, almost all in Chinese. Her only major publication in English was Studies in Chinese Poetry (1998), co-written with Harvard University scholar James Robert Hightower. Her Jialing Poetry Manuscript, published in 2000 in Taipei, includes 540 poems she composed between 1939 (when she was 15) and 1995. She has been called a modern Li Qingzhao, the famous Song dynasty Chinese poet.

In 1997, Hebei Education Publishing House published The Collected Works of Jialing in 10 volumes. In 2000, Guiguan Book Company of Taiwan published The Collected Works of Chia-ying Yeh in 24 volumes.

See also
Kang-i Sun Chang

References

1924 births
Living people
Canadian people of Mongolian descent
Canadian sinologists
Canadian women poets
Chinese Civil War refugees
Chinese emigrants to Canada
Chinese people of Mongolian descent
Chinese women poets
Educators from Beijing
Fellows of the Royal Society of Canada
Catholic University of Peking alumni
Academic staff of Fu Jen Catholic University
Harvard University faculty
Historians from Beijing
Manchu people
Michigan State University faculty
Academic staff of Nankai University
Academic staff of the National Taiwan University
People from Changhua County
Taiwanese people from Beijing
Academic staff of Tamkang University
Academic staff of the University of British Columbia
Women orientalists
Writers from Beijing
Chinese literary theorists
National University of Peking alumni